Pekka Laasanen (born 2 December 1960) is a Finnish boxer. He competed in the men's middleweight event at the 1984 Summer Olympics.

References

1960 births
Living people
Finnish male boxers
Olympic boxers of Finland
Boxers at the 1984 Summer Olympics
Sportspeople from Tampere
Middleweight boxers